Halstenbecker Bach is a small river of North Rhine-Westphalia, Germany. It is about 4.6 km long and flows into the Oberwiesengraben near Oesterweg.

See also
List of rivers of North Rhine-Westphalia

References

Rivers of North Rhine-Westphalia
Rivers of Germany